CHPD-FM (also called De Brigj) is a low-power Mennonite community radio station broadcasting at 105.9 FM in Aylmer, Ontario, Canada. The Aylmer and area Inter-Mennonite Community Council, was given approval in 2003, to operate a low-power German language FM radio station at 107.7 MHz to serve the local German-speaking Mennonite community. The station includes news, weather, ethnic and cultural music, and health care information programming. In 2005, CHPD moved to its current frequency at 105.9 FM.

The callsign meaning of CHPD is "Canada horcht Plaut Dietsch". Plautdietsch (Mennonite Low German) is the language of the Russian Mennonites. According to manager Hein Rempel, CHPD-FM is Canada's first and only Low German-language radio station. Hein was born in Mexico and moved to Canada in 1965.

External links
 De Brigj Radio - Mennonite Community Services
 
 

German-Canadian culture in Ontario
HPD
HDP
HPD
Mennonitism in Ontario
Radio stations established in 2005
2005 establishments in Ontario
Plautdietsch language
Russian Mennonite diaspora in Canada